The 1936–37 Montreal Canadiens season was the team's 28th season of play. After coach Cecil Hart and Howie Morenz returned to the club, the Canadiens placed first in the Canadian Division and qualified for the playoffs. Montreal met and lost to eventual Stanley Cup champion Detroit Red Wings in the semi-finals.

Regular season

The Montreal Canadiens had hit the bottom in 1935–36, and Babe Siebert was obtained to shore up the defence. Cecil Hart was rehired as coach. Hart placed a condition on his returning to the club, that former star Howie Morenz would return to the club. After being traded to Chicago and from there to New York, Morenz had struggled and the Rangers were willing trade partners for Morenz. Goalie George Hainsworth also returned to the Canadiens, signed as a free agent.

The Canadiens went from last to first in the Canadian Division. Morenz was just hitting his stride in January 1937, when tragedy struck. On one of his hurtling rushes, he was being checked by Earl Seibert of Chicago when his left skate got caught in the dasher of the end boards, and Morenz suffered a badly fractured leg. After suffering a nervous breakdown worrying about if he'd be able to come back, more bad luck occurred. On March 8, 1937, X-rays revealed that Howie had blood clots in his healing leg. An operation was scheduled for the next day, but when Howie ate a light supper and told the nurse he wanted to rest, in falling asleep his pallor suddenly changed and the nurse knew something was wrong. A blood clot had stopped his heart, and attempts to revive Howie failed. News of Morenz's death shocked the hockey world, and thousands filed past his bier, many in tears, to pay their last respects.

Final standings

Record vs. opponents

Playoffs
As champions of the Canadian division, the Canadiens proceeded directly to the semi-final against the Detroit Red Wings. Montreal lost the best-of-five series 3–2.

Schedule and results

Regular season

Player statistics

Regular season
Scoring

Goaltending

Playoffs
Scoring

Goaltending

Awards and records
 Wilf Cude – NHL Second All-Star team
 Babe Siebert – NHL First All-Star team, Hart Memorial Trophy
 O'Brien Cup – First place in Canadian division.

Transactions
 September 1, 1936 – Howie Morenz traded to Montreal by NY Rangers for cash.
 September 10, 1936 – Traded Leroy Goldsworthy, Sammy McManus and $10,000 to Boston for Babe Siebert and Roger Jenkins.
 November 24, 1936 – George Hainsworth signed as a free agent.

See also
1936–37 NHL season

References

Notes

Montreal Canadiens seasons
Montreal Canadiens
Montreal Canadiens